Best Interests is an upcoming four-part British television drama series, written by Jack Thorne. It stars Sharon Horgan and Michael Sheen as a married couple, fighting for their disabled daughter's medical care.

Plot
Nicci and Andrew's daughter Marnie has a life-threatening condition that brings them into a legal battle with her doctors over the right to die.

Cast
 Sharon Horgan as Nicci
 Michael Sheen as Andrew
 Alison Oliver as Katie
 Niamh Moriarty as Marnie
 Noma Dumezweni as Samantha
 Chizzy Akudolu as Mercy
 Des McAleer as Eddie
 Mat Fraser as Greg
 Gary Beadle as Frank
 Jack Morris as Tom
 Pippa Haywood as Judge Spottiswood
 Shane Zaza as Fred
 Lucian Msamati as Derek
 Lisa McGrillis as Brenda

Production
The series was commissioned by Piers Wenger, Director of BBC Drama and Charlotte Moore, BBC’s Chief Content Officer. The series began filming in London on March 2022.

References

External links 
 

2020s British drama television series
2023 British television series debuts
English-language television shows
BBC television dramas